İskenderun, historically known as Alexandretta (little Alexandria) and Scanderoon, is a city and district in Hatay Province on the Mediterranean coast of Turkey. Located on an alluvial plain, the city was heavily damaged by powerful earthquakes in February 2023 and subsequent aftershocks, floods and fires. 

The settlement was founded by Alexander the Great in 333 BC. The city was controlled by the Seleucids, which later ceded it to the Roman Empire. After the defeat of the Byzantines in the 8th century the Caliphate gained control of the city. During the First Crusade Alexandretta came under the control of the Principality of Antioch. The Mamluk Sultanate established control by conquering the crusader state. In the 15th century Ottoman Empire took control of the city, which held it until the early 20th century. During the First World War, the United Kingdom and France invaded the region. Until 1938, it remained as a sanjak of the French Syrian mandate. France granted independence to the sanjak, leading the formation of the Hatay State, which in turn united with Turkey on July 5, 1939.

Name
The city was founded as Alexandria (Ἀλεξάνδρεια) to commemorate Alexander the Great’s victory over the Persian Darius III at Issus (Cilicia) in (333 BC). Starting in the Middle Ages, Western pilgrims used the diminutive Romance form Alexandretta.

History

Antiquity
İskenderun preserves the name, but probably not the exact site, of Alexandria ad Issum. The settlement was founded by Alexander the Great in 333 BC to supersede Myriandus as the key to the Syrian Gates, about 37 km (23 miles) south of the scene of his victory at the Battle of Issus against the Persian King Darius III. Alexander camped in the highlands of İskenderun, around Esentepe, and then ordered the city to be established and named Alexandria. İskenderun is one of many cities founded on Alexander's orders, including Alexandria, Egypt. A memorial, a monument and a bronze statue for the victory raised at the city, and Herodian writes that they were there even at his time, ca. 200 AD.

The importance of the place comes from its relation to the Syrian Gates, the easiest approach to the open ground of Hatay Province and Aleppo.

Ecclesiastical history
The bishopric of Alexandria Minor was a suffragan of Anazarbus, the capital and so also the ecclesiastical metropolis of the Roman province of Cilicia Secunda. Greek menologia speak of Saint Helenus, and the martyr saints Aristio and Theodore as early bishops of the See. But the first documented one is Hesychius, who took part in the First Council of Nicaea in 325 and in a synod at Antioch in 341. Philomusus participated in the First Council of Constantinople in 381. Baranes is mentioned in connection with a synod at Antioch in 445. At the Council of Chalcedon in 451, Julianus was represented by his metropolitan, Cyrus of Anazarbus. Basilius was at the synod in Constantinople in 459 that condemned simoniacs. In 518, Paulus was deposed by the Byzantine Emperor Justinian for supporting the Jacobite Severus of Antioch.

No longer a residential diocese, Alexandria Minor is today listed by the Catholic Church as a titular see. In that list it was long named Cambysopolis, but the Annuario Pontificio now gives the correct ancient name.

Ottoman era
There was fighting here under the Ottoman Empire: in 1606 the army of General Kuyucu Murat Pasha suppressed the Jelali revolts. The Ottomans continued to fortify the city, and the remains of the early 17th-century Ottoman castle walls can still be seen where the Güzün stream crosses the Varyant road. The city was well described in 1675 by the English naval chaplain Henry Teonge in his diary. The next army to cross the Belen Pass and attack Anatolia through here were the Egyptians of Muhammad Ali in 1832.

However, in the later Ottoman period the city developed as the main port on the Mediterranean for the overland trade from Baghdad and India, which had great importance until the establishment of the Egyptian overland route. Iskenderun served as a base, first for Genoese and Venetian merchants, then Western and Northern European merchants. The British Levant Company maintained an agency and factory here for 200 years, until 1825, in spite of high mortality among its employees because of regional disease, some due to lack of sanitation systems. During the 19th century the port grew, and the road to Aleppo was improved. The railway was built in 1912.

At the outset of World War I, when Britain was contemplating the partition of the Ottoman Empire, Lord Kitchener considered the conquest of Alexandretta to be essential in providing Britain with a port and railhead from which to access Iraq. He proposed a new railway be built to the east from Alexandretta, which would greatly reduce the time for reaching India from the UK. The De Bunsen Committee (8 April - 30 June 1915), a British inter-departmental group which was set up to discuss the issue in greater detail, preferred Haifa for this purpose.

Ultimately the British decided not to attack the Ottoman Empire via Alexandretta. On 8 February 1915 the French foreign minister, Théophile Delcassé, protested to Britain's Foreign Secretary, Sir Edward Grey about such an attack, citing a commitment that Britain made in 1912 that it had no designs on Syria. The German field marshal, Hindenburg, later said that 
Perhaps not the whole course of the war, but certainly the fate of our Ottoman Ally, could have been settled out of hand, if England had secured a decision in that region, or even seriously attempted it. Possession of the country south of the Tauras [mountains] would have been lost to Turkey at a blow if the English had succeeded in landing at Alexandretta.Armenians, who have maintained a cultural and economic presence in Iskenderun for centuries, most notably due to trade, were wiped out in the Hamidian Massacres, Adana Massacres, and the Armenian genocide, after centuries of discrimination.

Republic of Hatay

Following the collapse of the Ottoman Empire at the end of the First World War, most of Hatay including İskenderun was occupied by French troops.

In July 1920 the San Remo conference did not assign Alexandretta sanjak to Turkey. Between 1921 and 1937, the city was part of the autonomous Sanjak of Alexandretta within French-controlled Syria, under the League of Nations French Mandate of Syria and the Lebanon.

The Republic of Hatay was founded in 1938 and, in 1939, it joined the Republic of Turkey after a referendum. The referendum was, and still is, regarded as illegitimate, as the Turkish government moved supporters into the city and the Turkish Army "expelled most of the province's Alawite Arabs, Greek and Armenian majority" to decide the referendum result.

In the 2010s Syria still claimed against Turkey its sovereignty on the Alexandretta region.

Modern era 
In 2012 İskenderun district was divided into three new districts, leading to the formation of the Arsuz, Payas (merging other parts from Dörtyol) and İskenderiye districts.

In February 2023, the city was heavily damaged by powerful earthquakes and subsequent floods and fires. On 8 February 2023, the fire at the Port of Iskenderun was extinguished but broke out again the next day.

Geography
İskenderun is located on the eastern Mediterranean coast on the Gulf of İskenderun, at the foot of the Nur Mountains (Amanos Mountains).

Climate
İskenderun has a Mediterranean climate with hot, dry summers, and mild, moderately rainy winters (Köppen: Csa, Trewartha: Cs). At certain times of the year the town is swept by a strong wind called 'Yarıkkaya'. The countryside contains large areas of fruit groves. It is an important producer of oranges, tangerines and lemons, and even tropical fruits such as mangoes.

Demographics
19th-century traveler Martin Hartmann put the population of Iskenderun at roughly 500 households with no entry on ethnicity. Out of the 29 other settlements he listed in the Ottoman nahiyah of Iskenderun, 19 were Turkish (366 houses), 2 were Alawite (100 houses), 2 were Turkish-Alawite mixed (28 houses), and no information was listed for the remaining 6.

Main sights
 The Cathedral of the Annunciation is the seat of the Roman Catholic Apostolic Vicariate of Anatolia.
 Bakras (Bagras) Castle, which was built in antiquity and restored many times in later centuries (particularly during the Crusades, when it was a stronghold of the Knights Templar), served as a watchtower on the  mountain road from İskenderun to Antakya (Antioch).

Gallery

Culture

Cuisine 
Distinctive İskenderun dishes include Künefe, a hot dessert with cheese. The main dishes include the Turkish staples such as döner and other kebabs served in the flat dürüm bread, lahmacun and also Antakya influenced cuisine including kibbeh, and sour pomegranate syrup used as a salad dressing. İskenderun in particular offers good quality fish and prawns.

Media 
İskenderun is served by the Güney Gazetesi newspaper.

Sports
The city has two association football clubs. One of them is Körfez İskenderunspor. The more successful İskenderunspor folded in 2006, although a phoenix club İskenderunspor 1967 was then founded in 2009.

The city's basketball team is called İskenderun Belediyesi Spor Kulübü.

In popular culture
İskenderun is featured in the film Indiana Jones and the Last Crusade as an important starting point for the Grail map. The State of Hatay is depicted as being ruled by a Sultan, although it was technically a transitional republic.

Notable natives
Nilüfer Çınar Çorlulu
Erol Erdinç
Cem Erman
Helenus of Alexandria (Cilicia)
Selçuk İnan
Yalçın Küçük
Yasin Özdenak
Sarkis Soghanalian
Jehan Barbur
Uğur Şahin

See also
 Çukurova
 Hatay Province
 Names of Asian cities in different languages
 Indiana Jones and the Last Crusade
List of cities founded by Alexander the Great

References

Sources
 
 İskenderun Guide

External links 

 İskenderun
 İskenderun pictures
 İskenderun News
 Information on İskenderun 
 Catholic Church of İskenderun

 
Çukurova
Ancient Greek archaeological sites in Turkey
Mediterranean port cities and towns in Turkey
History of Hatay Province
Populated coastal places in Turkey
Populated places in Hatay Province
Fishing communities in Turkey
Jewish communities in Turkey
Districts of Hatay Province
Catholic titular sees in Asia
Cities founded by Alexander the Great
330s BC establishments
Levant